The domestic goat breeds of Switzerland are, with the various names used for them in that country:

Extinct breeds 

Many Swiss goat breeds are considered to be extinct. These include:

 Bergeller Ziege
 Blenio-Valmaggiaziege or Tessiner Bergziege
 Bündneroberländer Ziege (Tavetscherziege or Disentiserziege)
 Chèvre du Val d'Illiez
 Emmentaler Ziege
 Engadiner Ziege
 Entlebucher Ziege
 Freiburger Ziege or Greyerzer Ziege
 Frutiger Ziege
 Glarner Ziege
 Jura Ziege
 Liviner Ziege  or Capra di Leventina
 Oberhalbsteinerziege or Schamser Ziege
 Oberhaslerziege or Hasliziege
 Oberwalliser Bergziege
 Obwaldnerziege
 Prättigauer Ziege
 Rivieraziege
 Schwarze Bündnerziege
 Schwarzenburger Ziege or Guggisberg Ziege
 Schwyzerziege
 Simmenthaler Ziege
 Unterwaldner Ziege
 Unterwalliser Ziege
 Urnerziege
 Zürcher Ziege (Weisse Zürcher Ziege or Weisse Schweizer Ziege)

See also
List of goat breeds
List of Swiss cattle breeds
Agriculture in Switzerland
Swiss cheeses and dairy products

References 

Goat
Goat